Rao Bahadur A. Yagappa Arulanandasamy Nadar (1897-1954) was an Indian politician and philanthropist who served as the Municipal Chairperson of Thanjavur. He is the elder brother of A. Y. S. Parisutha Nadar. Arulananda Nagar, a residential neighbourhood in Thanjavur is named after him.

References 

1897 births
1954 deaths
People from Thanjavur district
Tamil Nadu politicians
20th-century philanthropists